Helorum may refer to several different things:

Helorum, a figure in the Book of Mormon
Helorus, an ancient city in Sicily